AASF  may refer to:
 RAF Advanced Air Striking Force
 Asian Amateur Swimming Federation
 Army Aviation Support Facility